Noelia Marzol (born December 1, 1986) is an Argentine actress, dancer, hostess, gymnast, businesswoman and fashion designer. She rose to fame on the program 3, 2, 1 ¡A ganar!, where she was the secretary of Marley, and was in the program Minuto para Ganar. She also participated in numerous photo shoots for major magazines.

Noelia was co-hostess of the technology program Hiperconectados, along with Guillermo "Fierita" Catalano. In 2013, she was a finalist of the reality show Celebrity Splash. She had her own web dance program called Un Ocho.

In 2014, she made a special appearance in the telenovela Sres. Papis as Daniela. She was also on the program La Nave de Marley where they performed sketches, experiments and games.

She returned to the theater with Más respeto, que soy tu madre 2, with Antonio Gasalla. She was part of the panel of the program Infama for two months of 2015 and was one of the contestants on Bailando por un sueño 2015.

Early life
Noelia Marzol was born in Villa del Parque, Buenos Aires on December 1, 1986, but part of her upbringing was in the locality of Iriarte. Noelia is the daughter of Oscar Marzol and Inés Yonni. She has a brother, Sebastian Marzol, two years her senior. She studied at the school Schiller Schule and received the gold in the fifth year for the best average of the institution.

She trained in gymnastics from 4 years, reaching national awards in competitions. In dance jazz was formed by Gustavo Sajac and Marcela Cricket. She worked as an acrobat and danced in a circus for years in various shows. She was part of the Musical Theatre Company IUNA (Instituto Universitario Nacional del Arte), directed by Ricky Pashkus. There she joined the shows Esgarabal of Ricky Pashkus, El servicio se encuentra bloqueado of Marcela Cricket, released in 2007 and Con mi letra from Mecha Fernández released in 2008, all in the Centro Cultural Borges.

Career
In 2008, Marzol participated with Sebastián Wainraich in several sketches of "Kitsch", the humorous segment in the program Duro de Domar. She also participated as a dancer in the cast of La Rotativa del Maipo with Jorge Lanata in Maipo Theatre under the direction of Ricky Pashkus. In an interview, Marzol said she worked as a dancer in the Carmen Barbieri's troupe Fantástica.

In 2009, she joined the team Silvina Escudero on El Musical de tus Sueños for the program Marcelo Tinelli, ShowMatch winning first place in the competition. She shot a scene for the film Igualita a mí where she kissed the protagonist Adrián Suar. She also starred in the play El conejo, este mundo merece felicidad as Pechuga Love.

Marzol in 2010 was hired by Telefe, through an audition to be the secretary of Marley alongside Leandro Aldimonti on the program 3, 2, 1 ¡A ganar!. The program debuted on February 1, 2010 and ended on November 26 of that year, with 211 episodes. Marzol had gained more popularity as Marley's secretary in 3, 2, 1 ¡A ganar!. In 2011 she was again hired to be the secretary of Marley on Minuto para Ganar. The program had three seasons, airing from 2011 to 2013.

She also participated in Hiperconectados, a program about Argentinian digital culture, in 2011, along with Guillermo "Fierita" Catalano and Tomas Balmaceda Huarte. The program had two seasons and lasted until January 2012. In 2011, Noelia starred in the music hall Carrousel with Nazarene Vélez, Dominique Pestaña and Carolina Oltra. The play premiered on September 15 in the Tabarís Theatre.

In 2013, Marzol participated in the reality program Celebrity Splash and was one of the most prominent participants in the competition. Noelia reached the final and was fifth in the competition. In August 2013, Noelia started a new project called Un Ocho, which consists of a series of online dance tutorials for children. Noelia came to this project after much urging from the producers of Telefe.

On January 6, 2014, Marzol again reprised the role of secretary in the new program La Nave de Marley, but this time she had more participation than in previous programs. She also participated in some chapters of Sres. Papis where she played Daniela, a love interest of "Chori", played by Luciano Castro.  Marzol was hired by Antonio Gasalla to make her debut on stage in the work Más respeto, que soy tu madre 2 where she played the role of Sofía Bertotti, the daughter of the character Gasalla. The work premiered on January 16, 2015 in the Cervantes Theatre. 

Noelia is also part of the staff of the program Infama, which is transmitted by América TV. The program is led by Rodrigo Lussich. Marzol participated in the program Zapping as a guest panelist on February 9, 2015. On March 13, 2015, after two months of work on Infama, Noelia left the program because of her commitment with Más respeto, que soy tu madre 2 and having been called to the 2015 edition of Bailando por un sueño. Both occupations precluded her continuation in the program.

On March 24, 2015, it was officially confirmed on the program Este es el show that Marzol will be one of the new figures on Bailando por un sueño 2015 next to Luciano the Tirri, who will be her dance partner in the contest. On April 5, 2015, Diario Popular reported that Marzol was confirmed to film a movie called Locos sueltos en el ZOO. The film is co-produced by The Walt Disney Company Argentina and Argentina Sono Film. The shooting of the film began in early April at the Zoo of Buenos Aires. Its release date in Argentina was July 9, 2015.

Filmography

Films

Television

Realities shows

Programs

Theater

Awards and nominations

See also
Marley

Reference

External links

 
 Noelia Marzol in Instagram
 Noelia Marzol in Vine
 

1986 births
Living people
21st-century Argentine actresses
Actresses from Buenos Aires
Argentine television actresses
Argentine telenovela actresses
Argentine stage actresses
Argentine female dancers
Argentine theatrical dancer-actresses
Argentine female models
Universidad Nacional de las Artes alumni
21st-century women
People from Buenos Aires Province
Participants in Argentine reality television series
Bailando por un Sueño (Argentine TV series) participants
Bailando por un Sueño (Argentine TV series) winners